Mohamed Diab (born 1978) is an Egyptian screenwriter and director whose work often centers on pressing issues concerning Egyptian society. He is known for his directorial debut film Cairo 678 (Les Femmes du bus 678), which was released a month before the Egyptian revolution, and for directing Disney's Marvel series Moon Knight.

Career

El Gezeira 
El Gezeira, released in 2007, is inspired by the true story of the rise of a ruthless drug lord who lived on an island in Upper Egypt. The film set box office records and is often referenced in Egyptian pop culture. The sequel El Gezeira 2, released in 2014, begins with the escape of the drug lord from prison during the Egyptian revolution and his rebound to power back home on the island. The film set new Egyptian box office records becoming the highest grossing Egyptian and Arabic film of all time. Diab was only the writer of the film, while Sherif Arafa directed it.

Cairo 678 
Cairo 678 is Diab's directorial debut. The film follows the intertwining stories of a vigilante trio of women who take on the sexual harassment epidemic in Cairo. The film was released in December 2010 and is considered the most award-winning contemporary Egyptian film. The film was distributed internationally and fared well notably in France, where it sold 265,000 tickets and received ÉcranTotal's "coup de foudre du public" audience recognition award.

Eshtebak (Clash) 
Eshtebak (Clash) was supposed to be a film about the rise of the Egyptian revolution but eventually became a film that captures the fall of the revolution. The entire film is shot from within the confines of a police riot truck.

The film is a recipient of grants and funding from the San Francisco Film Society, CNC l'aide au Cinémas du Monde and ARTE France.

The film was an official selection for the 2016 Cannes Film Festival, Un Certain Regard category.

Moon Knight 
In October 2020 Diab was hired to direct episodes of Disney+ streaming series Moon Knight, set in the Marvel Cinematic Universe. Diab insisted on bringing Egyptian authenticity to the film's settings even though he was unable to film there. Attention to the smallest details was important to him, such as adding purple hues and the vibrant atmosphere of the Nile River at night. Together with his wife, Sarah Goher, they selected Egyptian music genre songs such as Bahlam Maak, El Melouk, and Batwanes Beek, which are all composed by Egyptian songwriters to convey the true vibe of the country.

Filmography

Awards

Cairo 678 (Les Femmes du Bus 678) 

In 2011, Christiane Amanpour presented Mohamed Diab with a Webby Award.

References 

1978 births
Living people
Egyptian screenwriters
Egyptian film directors
Egyptian television directors
21st-century screenwriters
People from Ismailia
Egyptian producers